This list of highest mountains of New Guinea shows all mountains on the island of New Guinea that are at least 3750 m high and have a topographic prominence of 500 m or more. These  50 peaks are also the highest mountains of Australasia  and the continent of Australia, where, outside New Guinea, the highest mountain is Aoraki / Mount Cook in New Zealand with a height of 3724 m. A list of highest mountains of Oceania with the same limitations is almost identical, with the addition of the Hawaiian volcanoes of Mauna Kea (4205 m) and Mauna Loa (4169 m) in 18th and 20th positions. The list also shows the 36 highest thus defined mountains of Indonesia, except for the 3805 m high Gunung Kerinci on Sumatra (#29 in Indonesia), and the 16 highest mountains of Papua New Guinea.

Limited topographical data
Many mountains in New Guinea are poorly surveyed and some major summits remain unnamed on maps. 
Even well measured mountains have conflicting heights on otherwise authoritative maps. For example, the highest point in Oceania, Carstensz Pyramid, was established to be 4884 m in 1973 when an Australian survey expedition put a beacon on the summit. This corresponded closely to the 4866 m estimate by the first Lorentsz Expedition in 1910 using repeated theodolite observations from the south coast. However, over time the mountain had grown in stature: measurements from northern observation peaks for the highest summit (each time Ngga Pulu) were 5000 m in 1910 by Ludolph Doorman and 5030 m in 1926 by Charles C.F.M. Le Roux. The 1936 Carstensz Expedition using barometric and boiling point measurements on the summit of Ngga Pulu also derived an elevation of 5030 m. After ascending the Pyramid in 1962, Heinrich Harrer even estimated that peak to be 17,096 feet or 5211 m high. The 1973 survey established that the 1936 barometric estimates were consistently between 118 and 127 m too high. Nevertheless, the 5030 m height is still prevalent in most atlases and maps.

Disappearing and disappeared glaciers of the Snowy Mountains 
All mountains in West Papua are in the Maoke Mountains, a translation of the name “Sneeuwgebergte” or Snowy Mountains endowed to them in 1623 by Jan Carstensz, at which time many of the peaks indeed were covered by extensive ice caps. By the beginning of the 20th century, at least five such glaciated regions remained on the highest mountains. In 1913, the 4520–4550 m high Prins Hendrik-top (now Puncak Yamin) was named and reported to have some "eternal" snow. The ice cap of Wilhelmina Peaks vanished between 1939 and 1963, while the Mandala / Juliana ice cap disappeared in the 1990s. The Idenburg glacier on Ngga Pilimsit dried up in 2003, leaving currently only the remnants of the glaciers on Mount Carstensz, the last of which are expected to disappear before 2025  and perhaps much earlier. The snow melt on the last mountain has caused a change of the highest summit of New Guinea: somewhere between 1936 and 1973 the title of highest summit of Oceania changed from Ngga Pulu, the highest point of the Northwall Firn (by then split into the West and East Northwall Firn; only small patches of the latter still exist), to the rocky spires of Carstensz Pyramid 3 km to its south-west.

The list
The list contains some unranked summits that are either of general interest, may show topographic prominences of >500 m given better data, or are more than 12 km isolated from any higher point.

Notes and references

 
New Guinea
Mountains
New Guinea